Jenny Mézile is a Haitian writer, dancer and choreographer. Fleeing the military repression after the coup against Jean-Bertrand Aristide, she started her performing arts career in France in 1992 with troupes such as Makina Loka and Banbòch Lakay. Mézile's first choreographed piece, Manzè Ida, premiered in 1997. Settling in Ivory Coast in 2006, she along with her husband Massidi Adiatou took leadership of dance-theatre troupe N’Soleh. In 2012 Mézile also launched the AFRIK URBANARTS dance and culture festival.

Choreographic works
1997: Manzè Ida
 2003: My Own Wara

Literary works
 2005: Toya, princesse des îles

References

Haitian dancers
Haitian women choreographers
Year of birth missing (living people)
Living people